Uyir Mel Aasai is a 1967 Indian Tamil-language drama film directed by C. P. Jambulingham and produced by Ayyappan Productions. The film stars Jaishankar, L. Vijayalakshmi and K. B. Sundarambal.

Plot

Cast 
Adapted from World Filmography: 1967:
 Jaishankar
 L. Vijayalakshmi
 K. B. Sundarambal
 K. A. Thangavelu
 Nagesh
 S. A. Ashokan

Production 
Uyir Mel Aasai was directed by C. P. Jambulingham and produced by Ayyappan Productions. The screenplay was written by T. N. Balu, and the cinematography was handled by Karnan.

Music 
The music of the film was composed by S. M. Subbaiah Naidu, with lyrics by Kannadasan.

Reception 
Kalki panned the film. In 1993, Sachi Sri Kantha wrote the film "is a mediocre Tamil movie [...] The only redeeming feature of that movie, as far as I can remember, was the Paapa [child] song of poet Kannadasan, which was sung by Carnatic diva K.B.Sundarambal. Kannadasan’s verse and Sundarambal’s voice! – splendid, is the only adjective one can use for that super combination."

References

Bibliography

External links 
 

1960s Tamil-language films
1967 drama films
1967 films
Films scored by S. M. Subbaiah Naidu
Indian drama films